The 1st V Chart Awards (第一届音悦V榜年度盛典) is a Chinese music awards hosted by YinYueTai in 2013 at Cadillac Arena, Beijing. The emcee for the awards ceremony were Mickey Huang and Ma Song.

Shortlisted criteria 
Merit categories for The 1st V Chart Awards are divided into 3 categories which are: "Date-based category", "Voting category" and "Jury category".

1. The "data-based category" award nominees are artists who released an official MV in between November 15, 2013 to November 30, 2013 and are selected according to their rank in the chart.

2. "The Most Popular Artists" series in the "voting category" of shortlisted nominees are the top 40 artists in all five regions. The top 5 artists with the most votes win.

3. "Jury category" nominees are shortlisted artists based on the year-long results of the China Billboard V Chart and the nominees will go through a panel of senior musicians.

Voting 
On March 10, 2013, The 1st V Chart Awards was officially launched after almost half a year of preparation and planning by YinYueTai and its global counterparts, Billboard and Gaon Charts. On March 12, the "Favourite Artist of the Year" series of polls began on the official website and commenced until April 11. The award ceremony was held two days after the polls were finalised.

Lucky Draw 
A lucky draw session was initiated to commemorate the establishment of the V Chart Awards by YinYueTai. The event commenced from March 22 until April 6 of 2013. Among the prizes to be won were tablet (1 unit), 1 headset (2 players), 1 mobster (6 players), genuine CD1 (15 players), Edifier H750 headset, Walkman M0 MK II speakers and the award ceremony entry tickets (a total of 150). After April 2, the turntable for the lucky draw was updated.

Personnel

Host 
YinYueTai

Data provider 
YinYueTai Mobile App, YinYueTai PC App, YinYueTai Official Website, Baidu

Interworking partners 
Billboard, Gaon Charts

Winners and nominees

References 

2013 music awards
2013 in Chinese music
Events in Beijing
V Chart Awards
April 2013 events in China